The Albatross is the debut studio album by American rock band, Foxing. The album was released on November 12, 2013 through Count Your Lucky Stars Records. "Rory" appeared on a best-of emo songs list by Vulture.

Background 
Bassist Josh Coll and vocalist Conor Murphy met in 2010, when Murphy's band Torchlight Red was playing a show with Coll's old act, Hunter Gatherer.

Track listing

Personnel 

Foxing
 Josh Coll — Group Member, Bass
 Jon Hellwig — Group Member, Percussion
 Eric Hudson — Group Member, Guitar
 Conor Murphy — Group Member, Vocals, Trumpet
 Ricky Sampson	— Group Member, Guitar

Production and recording
 Brian Arnold — Design, Layout
 Hamilton Ketchum — Engineer
 Tom Pini — Engineer
 Kevin Russ — Photography
 Carl Saff — Mastering

Additional musicians
 Dre Concepcion — Flute
 Adam Gabbert — Sax (Alto), Sax (Baritone)
 Madeline Lackey — Vocals
 Sarah Moncey — Vocals
 Annette Moeller — Violin
 Liz Myers — Cello
 Sam Naumann — Orchestration
 Tom Pini — Accordion
 Justin Reynolds — Trombone
 Emma Tiemann — Violin
 Ryan Wasoba — Engineer, Mixing, Producer
 Kira Webster — Vocals

References 
Citations

Sources

External links 
 

2013 debut albums
Foxing (band) albums